Joseph Gourmelon (died 6 October 2019) was a French politician who served as a Deputy.

References

1938 births
2019 deaths
People from Finistère
Deputies of the 7th National Assembly of the French Fifth Republic
Deputies of the 8th National Assembly of the French Fifth Republic
Deputies of the 9th National Assembly of the French Fifth Republic
Socialist Party (France) politicians
Politicians from Brittany